Eupogonius brevifascia is a species of beetle in the family Cerambycidae. It was described by Galileo and Martins in 2009. It is known from Costa Rica.

References

Eupogonius
Beetles described in 2009